is a former Japanese football player.

Playing career
Ito was born in Saitama Prefecture on April 28, 1979. After graduating from high school, he joined the Japan Football League club Kawasaki Frontale in 1998. He played several matches as center back from first season and the club was promoted to the J2 League in 1999 and the J1 League in 2000. However he did not play at all in 2000. In 2001, he moved to the J2 club Omiya Ardija based in his local region of Saitama Prefecture. However he did not play at all. In 2003, he moved to the J2 club Montedio Yamagata. He played several matches and then retired at the end of the 2003 season.

Club statistics

References

External links

jsgoal.jp

1979 births
Living people
Association football people from Saitama Prefecture
Japanese footballers
J1 League players
J2 League players
Japan Football League (1992–1998) players
Kawasaki Frontale players
Omiya Ardija players
Montedio Yamagata players
Association football defenders